The legal status of women in the United States is, in comparison to other countries, equal to that of men, and generally, women are viewed as having equal social standing to men as well. However, among other similar laws, the United States has never ratified the U.N's Convention on the Elimination of All Forms of Discrimination against Women.

History

Laws

Convention to Eliminate All Forms of Discrimination Against Women
The United States has never ratified the U.N.'s Convention on the Elimination of All Forms of Discrimination against Women, although it played an important role in drafting the treaty. As of 2014, the United States is thus one of only seven nations which have not ratified it – also including Iran, Palau, Somalia, South Sudan, Sudan, and Tonga.

Equal Rights Amendment
38 states as of January 2020 have ratified the Equal Rights Amendment (ERA).  Three-fourths or 38 out of 50 states are required to ratify a proposed amendment to the U.S. Constitution. Several states originally ratified the ERA, but subsequently rescinded the ratification.  Recessions in other amendments have been ignored by the courts.  The status of the ERA is currently unclear.

Marriage 
Child marriage, as defined by UNICEF, is observed in the United States. The UNICEF definition of child marriage includes couples who are formally married, or who live together as a sexually active couple in an informal union, with at least one member — usually the girl — being less than 18 years old. The latter practice is more common in the United States, and it is officially called cohabitation. Laws regarding child marriage vary in the different states of the United States. Generally, children 16 and over may marry with parental consent, with the age of 18 being the minimum in all but two states to marry without parental consent. Those under 16 generally require a court order in addition to parental consent.

Parental leave
The United States is the only high income country not to provide required paid parental leave.

Reproductive rights

Birth control is legal nationwide as of 1965. Abortion was made legal nationwide as of 1973, with states allowed to place regulations on abortion which fall short of prohibition after the first trimester of pregnancy. As of June 25, 2022 the right to abortion under 25 weeks of life was revoked.

Representation in government

President and Vice President

A woman has never been President of the United States. Kamala Harris is the first woman to become Vice President of the United States, in 2021.

United States House of Representatives

The first woman elected to the United States House of Representatives was in 1917, Jeannette Rankin, who represented Montana. Women who served before her were finishing someone else's term who died in office or had resigned.

In 2007, Nancy Pelosi was elected the 52nd Speaker of the House of Representatives. Pelosi is the only woman in U.S. history to serve as Speaker. In 2019 she was again elected Speaker for the 2nd time (55th) and the first former Speaker to return to the position since 1955. Pelosi is the second highest ranking female elected official and second in the presidential line of succession.

As of 2021, there are 119 women of 435 total in the U.S. House of Representatives, 88 Democrats, 31 Republicans.

United States Senate

In its first 130 years in existence, the Senate was entirely male. In 1931, Hattie Wyatt Caraway was the first woman to win election to the United States Senate. Margaret Chase Smith was the first woman to serve in both the House and the Senate in 1949. In 1992, an unprecedented four women were elected to the Senate, Patty Murray, Dianne Feinstein, Barbara Boxer and Carol Moseley Braun who was also the first woman of color in the Senate. Today, of 100 members of the U.S. Senate, there are 24 women senators, 16 Democrats and 8 Republicans.

Presidential Cabinet

In 1933 Frances Perkins was appointed United States Secretary of Labor under President Franklin D. Roosevelt, making her the first woman to serve in a presidential cabinet. In 1949, Georgia Neese Clark was the first woman appointed Treasurer of the United States followed by Oveta Culp Hobby as United States Secretary of Health, Education, and Welfare in 1953.

The 1970s would see several women appointed for the first time in cabinet positions such as Carla Anderson Hills, United States Secretary of Housing and Urban Development in 1975, Juanita M. Kreps, United States Secretary of Commerce in 1977 and Shirley Hufstedler, Secretary of Education in 1979.

In the 1980s, Elizabeth Dole was appointed United States Secretary of Transportation in 1983. Elaine Chao would become third woman and first Asian American to hold this position in 2017. Susan Engeleiter was appointed the head of the Small Business Administration in 1989.

In the 1993, Janet Reno as United States Attorney General and Sheila Widnall as United States Secretary of the Air Force were the first women appointed to their positions. Three women have served as United States Secretary of State. The first was Madeleine Albright in 1997. In 2005 Condoleezza Rice became the second woman and first person of color to serve in this position. She was succeeded by former First Lady of the United States and U.S. Senator, Hillary Clinton in 2009.

Ann Veneman as United States Secretary of Agriculture, Gale Norton, United States Secretary of the Interior and Susan Livingstone, United States Secretary of the Navy  were all the first women appointed to their positions in 2001 and 2003 respectively.

Janet Napolitano became the first woman to be appointed United States Secretary of Homeland Security in 2009 and Gina Haspel was the first woman appointed Director of the Central Intelligence Agency in 2018.

United States Supreme Court

On the Supreme Court, there are three women justices, Sonia Sotomayor, Elena Kagan, and Amy Coney Barrett.  The first woman justice was Sandra Day O'Connor in 1981 followed by Ruth Bader Ginsburg in 1993.

State and local governments

As of 2021, there are 9 women state governors, 6 Democrats, 3 Republicans; there are 17 Lt. Governors, 10 Democrats, 7 Republicans. Women hold 31.0% of the seats on state legislatures. Of the 100 largest cities in the United States, 31 have a woman as mayor.

Twenty-one state supreme courts (the highest state court) are currently or have been majority female.

Desire to leave the United States 
According to a Gallup poll from January 2019, 40 percent of women under the age of 30 would like to leave the United States, with most preferring Canada as a place to live for a better life.

Rankings

Gender equality ranking
As of 2021, the United States is ranked 30th of 156 applicable countries in gender equality on the World Economic Forum's Gender Gap Index.

Statistics

Education
As of 2014, women in the United States earn more post-secondary (college and graduate school) degrees than men do.

Marriage
As of 2013, the most recent year for which statistics are available, average age at first marriage in the United States is 27 for women and 29 for men.

Workforce
As of 2014, women are 46.5% of the total United States workforce.

Sex discrimination has been outlawed in non-ministerial employment in the United States since 1964 nationwide; however, under a judicially created doctrine called the "ministerial exemption," religious organizations are immune from sex discrimination suits brought by "ministerial employees," a category that includes such religious roles as priests, imams or kosher supervisors.

A woman's median salary in the United States has increased over time, although as of 2014 it is only 77% of man's median salary, a phenomenon often referred to as the Gender Pay Gap. (A woman's average salary is reported as 84% of a man's average salary.) Whether this is due to discrimination is very hotly disputed, while economists and sociologists have provided evidence both supporting and debunking this assertion.

Violence 

Violence against women has been recognized as a public health concern in the United States. Culture in the country has promoted the trivialization of women-directed violence, with media in the United States creating the appearance of violence against women unimportant to the public.

The Centers for Disease Control and Prevention and the National Institute of Justice reports that about 1 in every 4 women suffer from at least one physical assault experience from a partner during adulthood. Studies have found that around 20% of women in the United States have been victims of rape with many incidents of rape being underreported according to a 2013 study.

In 2017, the United States was ranked the world's 9th safest country for women by the New World Wealth research group.

See also 
 Arthur and Elizabeth Schlesinger Library on the History of Women in America

References

Further reading
 

 
United States
Time Person of the Year